Eren Bülbül (1 January 2002 - 11 August 2017) was a Turkish 15-year-old boy from Maçka, Trabzon who was killed during the clashes between the Kurdistan Workers' Party (PKK) and the Turkish security forces in part of a Turkish military patrol during the Turkish-PKK conflict.

Life
The son of Ayşe and Hasan Bülbül, Bülbül was one of 12 children. He spent his entire life in Maçka, Trabzon, as he went to local Çatak Primary School and later Maçka Anatolian Religious High School. He lost his father in 2016. He worked in his family's garden and liked sports, an ambitious fan of Trabzonspor.

Death 
On August 11, 2017, a group of PKK militants entered a house to obtain supplies after clashes with police. Bülbül saw them and informed the gendarmerie. He accompanied the police, showing them the house which the militants had entered. As a result of an attack by the PKK, both Bülbül and Gendarmerie Sergeant Major Ferhat Gedik were killed. After his death, 41 bullets were taken out from Senior Master Sergeant Ferhat Gedik's body.

Reactions 
Later, Eren's mother Ayşe Bülbül said that his death had become the sorrow of the whole country. Additionally, his mother criticised the Turkish security forces who had taken her son with themselves to show where PKK militants were hiding, saying: ''My son would've liked to be a martyr but a martyr in the military, not in front of his door.''. The party leader of the Republican Peoples' Party (CHP) Kemal Kiliçdaroğlu as well as Serpil Kemalbay of the Peoples Democratic Party (HDP) condemned the death of Bülbül.

Legacy 

On 25 June 2019, Turkish Airlines launched a survey on Twitter to name the new Boeing 787 aircraft. Among the options suggested in the survey were ancient city names such as Perga, Assos, Göbekli Tepe, and Zeugma, but Eren Bülbül's name was not included in the list. When many Twitter users initiated a campaign to put the name Eren Bülbül on the plane, Turkish Airlines responded by naming the plane after Bülbül's hometown Maçka. In August 2021 Turkish manufacturer of special purpose and military vehicles, Katmerciler, presented a new tactical vehicle, Katmerciler Eren, named after Eren Bülbül.

References

2002 births
2017 deaths
August 2017 events in Turkey
August 2017 crimes in Asia
Deaths by firearm in Turkey
History of Trabzon Province
Murdered Turkish children
Incidents of violence against boys
Kurdistan Workers' Party attacks
People murdered in Turkey
People from Maçka
Terrorism deaths in Turkey
Turkish terrorism victims
2017 murders in Turkey